NGC 6400 is an open cluster located in the constellation Scorpius. It is designated as II2m in the galaxy morphological classification scheme and was discovered by the Scottish astronomer James Dunlop on 13 May 1826. It is at a distance of 3,097 light years away from Earth.

See also 
 List of NGC objects (6001–7000)
 List of NGC objects

References

External links 
 

Open clusters
6400
Scorpius (constellation)